was an admiral in the early Imperial Japanese Navy.

Life and military career
Ogura was born to a samurai family serving the Tokugawa shogunate in Edo. He entered the 5th class of the Imperial Japanese Naval Academy in July 1878 and was commissioned as a second lieutenant in January 1881. His classmates included Ijuin Gorō and Dewa Shigetō.  
He was promoted to lieutenant commander in 1891 and was on the staff of the Personnel Department of the Ministry of the Navy of Japan in March 1893. The following year, he was executive officer of the cruiser .

He received his first command, the gunboat  on 27 August 1895 and remained captain until 4 February 1897. After commanding the cruiser  from 4 February 1897 to 1 June 1897, he was promoted to captain and was appointed captain of the cruiser . From September 1898 he was captain of the cruiser . In May 1899, Ogura was sent to France to oversee the completion of the cruiser , of which he remained captain until 24 May 1902. He then captained the battleship  from 24 May 1902 to 21 November 1903. Afterwards, he was chief-of-staff of the Yokosuka Naval District. 
At the start of the Russo-Japanese War of 1904-1905, Ogura was promoted to rear admiral and was appointed 5th Division of the Japanese Third Fleet,  a motley collection of obsolete warships which served as a final reserve force at the Battle of Tsushima. After the war, he returned to the Personnel Bureau of the Ministry of the Navy, and was promoted to vice admiral in 1908. He went into the reserves the following year.

References

External links 

1853 births
1928 deaths
Imperial Japanese Navy admirals
Japanese military personnel of the First Sino-Japanese War
Japanese military personnel of the Russo-Japanese War
People of Meiji-period Japan